The National Science Board established the Vannevar Bush Award in 1980 to honor Vannevar Bush's unique contributions to public service. The annual award recognizes an individual who, through public service activities in science and technology, has made an outstanding "contribution toward the welfare of mankind and the Nation." The recipient of the award receives a bronze medal struck in the memory of Dr. Bush. 

Vannevar Bush (1890–1974) was a prominent scientist, adviser to US presidents, and the force behind the establishment of the National Science Foundation. In 1945, at the request of President Franklin D. Roosevelt, he wrote a famous essay entitled Science, the Endless Frontier which recommended that a foundation be established by the United States Congress to serve as a focal point for the USA Federal Government's support and encouragement of research and education in science and technology as well as the development of a national science policy. The legislation creating the National Science Foundation was signed by president Harry S. Truman on May 10, 1950.

List of winners
Source: National Science Board

See also
 List of general science and technology awards 
 Prizes named after people
 Enrico Fermi Award

External links
 Award Home Page

American science and technology awards
Awards established in 1980
National Science Foundation